Jubur (also spelled Jebour, Jibour, Jubour, Jabur, Jaburi, Jebouri, and Jabara) is the largest Arab tribe in Iraq that scattered throughout central Iraq. Part of the tribe settled in Hawija and Kirkuk in the eighteenth century. Al-Jiburi, along with the 'Azza, Dulaim, Janabi and Obaidi federations, are sub-groups of the Zubaydi tribe, which is one of the Yemeni Arab tribal groups of Iraq.

Religion 
The Jubour were originally Sunni Muslims until the 19th century when few of them started to convert to Shia Islam, especially in the mid-Euphrates region of southern Iraq. A large majority of them are still Sunni.

During Armenian genocide of 1915 

During Armenian genocide of 1915, al-Jabur tribe Arabs sheltered many Armenians who were deported in the desert of al-Jezira.And they included them in their clan, like the annexation of the Philins, the Kurds, and many other races.

Battles and wars
The Jubouri tribe has battled against the Islamic State of Iraq and the Levant since 2014 and retaken control of several cities and villages in Central Iraq. In March 2015, Al Jubouri and the Iraqi Armed Forces were fighting the Islamic State of Iraq and the Levant in the Second Battle of Tikrit (2015).

See also
Shammar
Shia Islam in Iraq

References

The Iraqi Tribal Structure,  Jesmeen Khan

Arab groups
Tribes of Arabia
Tribes of Iraq